Martinus Franciscus "Mats" van Huijgevoort (born 16 January 1993) is a Dutch footballer who plays as a centre-back for Achilles Veen in the Vierde Divisie. He formerly played professionally for Feyenoord, Excelsior, Willem II and FC Den Bosch.

After his professional career, he played for Oss '20 and Kozakken Boys before moving to Achilles Veen in the Hoofdklasse from the 2020–21 season.

References

External links

Netherlands U17 stats at OnsOranje
Netherlands U19 stats at OnsOranje

Living people
1993 births
People from Loon op Zand
Association football defenders
Dutch footballers
Netherlands youth international footballers
Feyenoord players
Excelsior Rotterdam players
Willem II (football club) players
FC Den Bosch players
Kozakken Boys players
Achilles Veen players
Eredivisie players
Eerste Divisie players
Tweede Divisie players
Vierde Divisie players
Footballers from North Brabant